Glooscap 35 is a Mi'kmaq reserve located in Kings County, Nova Scotia.

It is administratively part of the Glooscap First Nation.

References

See also
 Talk:Glooscap 35

Indian reserves in Nova Scotia
Communities in Kings County, Nova Scotia
Mi'kmaq in Canada